Olushandja Dam is a dam on the Etaka River outside of Oshakati in the Oshana Region of Namibia. The dam was completed in 1990. Its lake has a maximum capacity of 42.331 million cubic metres, and stores water from the Calueque Dam on the Cunene River in nearby Angola which supports the Ruacana Power Station downstream.

References

1990 establishments in Namibia
Oshakati
Dams in Namibia
Dams completed in 1990
Buildings and structures in Oshana Region